Rodolfo Torres Ruiz was a Mexican footballer who played in the Mexican Primera Division in the mid-1940s to the late 1950s with clubs Club Marte, Puebla FC, Deportivo Irapuato. He played with Puebla for 7 years in which in 1953 helped the club win the Copa Mexico.

External links
 http://tur.worldfootball.net/teams/puebla-fc/1949/2/ stats

1929 births
Living people
Mexican footballers
Club Puebla players
Association football defenders